Perrysburg High School is a public high school in Perrysburg, Ohio, United States.  It is the only high school in Perrysburg Exempted Village School District (Perrysburg Schools). Athletic teams are known as the Yellow Jackets with school colors of black and gold and the school competes as a member of the Northern Lakes League.  Perrysburg was graded A+ and ranked #24 in Ohio in Niche's 2021 Suburbs with the Best Public Schools in Ohio, based on state test scores, graduation rates, SAT/ACT scores, teacher quality and student and parent reviews. Perrysburg Schools has been named among the “Best Communities for Music Education” every year since 2007. Perrysburg High School has earned the Ohio Department of Education's Purple Star designation, recognizing the schools’ commitment to serving military-connected students and families. The Class of 2021 was offered $21.8 Million in scholarship awards. The average teacher experience is 12 years and 72% of teachers have at least a master's degree in the school district.

State championships

 Girls Softball – 1991 
 Girls Volleyball – 1979 
 Girls Soccer – 2012 
 Girls Cross Country – 2021

Notable alumni
Jerry Glanville, football coach
Sam Jaeger, actor
Jim Leyland, baseball manager
Anna Tunnicliffe, 2008 Olympic Gold Medalist
Burke Badenhop, baseball pitcher
Douglas Brinkley, historian & writer
T. J. Fatinikun, football player
Lance K. Landrum, United States Air Force lieutenant general
Joseph E. Baird, politician
Kate Wetzel Jameson, educator

References

External links
 
 Perrysburg Exempted Village School District official website

High schools in Wood County, Ohio
Public high schools in Ohio
Perrysburg, Ohio